Podnanos (formerly Šent Vid or Šentvid (nad Vipavo)) is a village in the upper Vipava Valley in the Municipality of Vipava in the traditional Inner Carniola region of Slovenia. It is now generally regarded as part of the Slovenian Littoral. It lies below Mount Nanos, from which it gets its current name.

Name
The name of the settlement was changed from Šent Vid (literally, 'Saint Vitus') to Podnanos (literally, 'below Mount Nanos') in 1952. The name was changed on the basis of the 1948 Law on Names of Settlements and Designations of Squares, Streets, and Buildings as part of efforts by Slovenia's postwar communist government to remove religious elements from toponyms. The local name of the settlement, Šembid, is derived from Šent Vid.

Church
The parish church in the settlement is dedicated to Saint Vitus and belongs to the Koper Diocese.

Notable residents
Stanko Premrl (1880–1965), priest and composer of the national anthem of Slovenia
Janko Premrl (nom de guerre Vojko, 1920–1943), anti-fascist resistance fighter and organizer of the Slovenian Partisan movement in the Slovenian Littoral
Igor Rosa, slovenian motorcycle and industrial designer (Tomos)

References

External links

Podnanos Homepage - Tourist information center
Podnanos at Geopedia (maps, aerial photographs)
Podnanos on Google Maps (maps, photographs, street view)

Populated places in the Municipality of Vipava